Djikoloum Mobele (born 23 November 1978) is a Chadian sprinter who specialized in the 100 metres.

Mobele competed at the 2004 Summer Olympics in Athens, Greece but did not finish in heat 7. He has also competed at the 2003 World Championships and the 2004 World Indoor Championships.

External links
 
 Djikoloum Mobele at Yahoo! sports

1978 births
Living people
Chadian male sprinters
Athletes (track and field) at the 2004 Summer Olympics
Olympic athletes of Chad